Erpelding is a surname of German origin. Notable people with the surname include:

Diane Erpelding (born 1982), Luxembourgish dressage rider
Mat Erpelding (born 1975), American politician

Surnames of German origin